The 56th Golden Bell Awards was held on October 2, 2021, at the Sun Yat-sen Memorial Hall in Taipei, Taiwan. The ceremony was televised by Sanlih E-Television (Cable/Online) and Public Television Service (Terrestrial); it was hosted by news anchor and online personality Retina (Shi Wang-mo).

Winners and nominees 
Below is the list of winners and nominees for the main categories

References

External links 
 Official Website of the 56th Golden Bell Awards

2021
2021 television awards
2021 in Taiwan